Kalateh-ye Gaz (also Romanized as Kalāteh-ye Gaz) is a village in Pain Jovin Rural District, Helali District, Joghatai County, Razavi Khorasan Province, Iran. At the 2006 census, its population was 110, in 30 families.

References 

Populated places in Joghatai County